388 Greenwich Street, originally called the Shearson Lehman Plaza and more recently the Travelers Building, is a skyscraper at 388 Greenwich Street, with frontages on North Moore and West Streets, in the TriBeCa neighborhood of Lower Manhattan in New York City. 388 Greenwich Street forms a complex with the neighboring 10-story 390 Greenwich Street near the Hudson River. Currently, the two buildings comprise the global headquarters of financial services corporation Citigroup. 388 Greenwich stands about ten blocks north of the World Trade Center site and is among TriBeCa's tallest. Like many other office buildings in Manhattan, 388 Greenwich Street contains in addition to office space, a fitness center, full-service dining facilities, a medical center, a conference center, a day care center, and an outdoor park. The building is one of the few in New York with double-deck elevators. In the aftermath of the September 11 attacks, the building's courtyard was used as a triage center.

History
In December 2007, 388 Greenwich Street and 390 Greenwich Street were sold by Citigroup in order to reduce real estate exposure on its balance sheet. The complex was acquired by a joint venture consisting of SL Green Realty and SITQ for US$1.58 billion. Citigroup, however, maintained their primary presence in the complex through a 15-year leaseback arrangement. In 2016, the bank repurchased the complex and relocated the company's headquarters from 399 Park Avenue.

In 2016, CitiGroup committed to staying in the building and announced a renovation. The exterior makeover, led by Skidmore, Owings & Merrill, included the addition of a glass curtain wall to the lower floors of the tower and all of 390 Greenwich Street on the west side of the complex. Gensler provided interior renovations, including a new lobby.

Umbrella icon
The sign was erected in May 1997; some observers found it emblematic, while others considered it to be distracting. Complementing this neon sign, an iconic, steel ,  red umbrella sculpture also stood outside 388 Greenwich St at street-level. Both have been removed from the building, the latter in the summer of 2007, as part of a deal between Citigroup and St. Paul Travelers Companies which acquired the logo.

References

External links 

1988 establishments in New York City
Bank company headquarters in the United States
Citigroup buildings
Office buildings completed in 1988
Privately owned public spaces
Skyscraper office buildings in Manhattan
The Travelers Companies
Tribeca
West Side Highway